Shadwick Criss (born January 11, 1976) is a former American football defensive back. He played for the Calgary Stampeders in 1999, the Jacksonville Jaguars in 2000 and for the BC Lions in 2003.

References

1976 births
Living people
American football defensive backs
Missouri Tigers football players
Calgary Stampeders players
Jacksonville Jaguars players
BC Lions players